Tubalcain may refer to:

 Tubal-cain, biblical character associated with metalworking
 Tubalcain Alhambra, anime and manga character
 Tubal Cain mine, abandoned copper mine in Olympic National Park in the U.S. state of Washington
 Clan of Tubal Cain, a traditional witch coven formed by British neopagan Robert Cochrane
 Tubal Cain, the pen name of Tom Walshaw, a prolific British writer on model engineering
 Tubalcain, a 1990s band with Athan Maroulis as a member